Ross Leon Gaynor (born 9 September 1987) from Ardee, County Louth is an Irish professional footballer who played in the Football League for Millwall.

Club career
Gaynor began his career playing juvenile football in Ardee with Square United and Ardee Celtic before moving on to Belvedere .

Gaynor played for the Dundalk Schoolboys League side. He opted to begin his career with Millwall. Gaynor later joined Sutton United on loan in 2007 but was released at the end of the 2007–08 season, subsequently joining Cobh Ramblers. Gaynor then signed for Sporting Fingal in December 2008 for the season, but joined Drogheda United on loan in July 2009. On 9 February 2010 he signed for Dundalk.

In December 2011, Gaynor signed for Sligo Rovers. Despite starting out on the wing he eventually settled into the left back position due to an injury to regular left back Iarfhlaith Davoren. He was an important part of the defence that secured a first league title in 35 years for Rovers while also providing several assists.

He made a good start to the 2013 season again in the left-back position and scored his first league goal for the club in the home win over Derry City. An injury towards the end of the year restricted his appearances but he added an FAI Cup winners' medal to his collection coming on as a sub in the 3–2 win against Drogheda in the final.

International
At the age 18 he was capped by the Republic of Ireland under-21s, and scored twice on his debut. His second cap came against Portugal.

He scored on his debut for the Irish under 17s 19s and 21s. He was capped a number of times at under-23 level; the latest being on 26 May 2010 against England C.

Honours
Sligo Rovers
League of Ireland (1): 2012
FAI Cup (1): 2013
Setanta Sports Cup (1): 2014

References

1987 births
Living people
Millwall F.C. players
Cobh Ramblers F.C. players
Sporting Fingal F.C. players
Drogheda United F.C. players
Dundalk F.C. players
Sligo Rovers F.C. players
Cork City F.C. players
Linfield F.C. players
NIFL Premiership players
League of Ireland players
Republic of Ireland association footballers
Republic of Ireland under-21 international footballers
Republic of Ireland under-23 international footballers
Association footballers from County Louth
Belvedere F.C. players
Association football wingers
Association football fullbacks
People from Ardee